The 2017 Tour of Austria was the 69th edition of the Tour of Austria cycling stage race. The -long race started in Graz on 2 July with a prologue individual time trial up the Schloßberg hill, and concluded in Wels on 8 July.

The race consisted of 6 road stages and the aforementioned prologue, one stage less than the 2016 edition. The race was part of the 2017 UCI Europe Tour, and was rated as a 2.1 event.

The race was won by home rider Stefan Denifl, who took the first victory of his professional career.

Schedule
The route for the race was announced on 9 June 2017.

Participating teams
Nineteen teams were initially scheduled to compete in the 2017 edition of the Tour of Austria, as announced on 9 June 2017. These included four UCI WorldTeams, eight UCI Professional Continental teams, six UCI Continental teams and an Italian national team.

 were denied entry to the race, after the squad was banned for 30 days following the positive doping tests for Stefano Pirazzi and Nicola Ruffoni prior to the Giro d'Italia.

Stages

Prologue
2 July 2017 — Schloßberg (Graz), individual time trial (ITT)

Stage 1
3 July 2017 — Graz to Vienna,

Stage 2
4 July 2017 — Vienna to Pöggstall,

Stage 3
5 July 2017 — Wieselburg to Altheim,

Stage 4
6 July 2017 — Salzburg Airport to Kitzbüheler Horn,

Stage 5
7 July 2017 — Kitzbühel to Alpendorf,

Stage 6
8 July 2017 — Alpendorf to Wels,

Classification leadership table
In the 2017 Tour of Austria, four jerseys were awarded. The general classification was calculated by adding each cyclist's finishing times on each stage. Time bonuses were awarded to the first three finishers on all stages except the prologue: the stage winner won a ten-second bonus, with six and four seconds for the second and third riders respectively. Bonus seconds were also awarded to the first three riders at intermediate sprints – three seconds for the winner of the sprint, two seconds for the rider in second and one second for the rider in third. The leader of the general classification received a yellow jersey. This classification was considered the most important of the 2017 Tour of Austria, and the winner of the classification was considered the winner of the race.

The second jersey represented the mountains classification, marked by a red jersey with white polka dots and yellow trim. Points for this classification were won by the first riders to the top of each categorised climb, with more points available for the higher-categorised climbs. For the hors- and first-category climbs, the top five riders scored points, while the other categories rewarded the top three riders with points.

Additionally, there was a points classification, which awarded a green jersey. In the points classification, cyclists received points for finishing in the top 15 in a stage, with the exception of the opening prologue stage. For winning a stage, a rider earned 15 points, with 12 for second, 10 for third, 8 for fourth with a point fewer per place down to two points for 10th place. Points towards the classification could also be accrued – awarded on a 4–2–1 scale – at intermediate sprint points during each stage; these intermediate sprints also offered bonus seconds towards the general classification as noted above.

The fourth and final jersey represented the classification for Austrian riders, marked by a red jersey. This was decided the same way as the general classification, but only riders born in Austria were eligible to be ranked in the classification. There was also a team classification, in which the times of the best three cyclists per team on each stage were added together; the leading team at the end of the race was the team with the lowest total time.

References

External links

 

2017
2017 in Austrian sport
2017 UCI Europe Tour